Scotstown is a city in Le Haut-Saint-François Regional County Municipality in the Estrie region of Quebec, Canada.  Its population in the Canada 2016 Census was 472.

The town is renowned for its multiple legends carried by its first settlers, who emigrated from Scotland.

Demographics 

Notable people
Robert James Cromie, born in Scotstown in 1887, was the publisher of the Vancouver Sun from 1917 until his death in 1936.

References

External links

Cities and towns in Quebec
Incorporated places in Estrie
Le Haut-Saint-François Regional County Municipality